Summer in the Golden Valley (Bosnian: Ljeto u zlatnoj dolini) is a 2003 Bosnian film by Srđan Vuletić, produced by Ademir Kenović. The movie is about a 16-year-old boy who has to repay his dead father's debt. In order to collect money, his friend and he get involved in Sarajevo's underground crime.

Plot
At the traditional Muslim funeral service for his father, Fikret Varupa a sixteen-year-old boy from Sarajevo, learns that his father owes money to Hamid, a man he does not even know. The debt is considerable and Hamid does not want it to go to the grave with the body, so the debt automatically passes from the father to the son.
Since in Bosnia this way of collecting debts, at a funeral, is considered to be utterly humiliating, it is never, ever applied. Fikret and his entire family become subjects of ridicule.
Fikret, who is practically still a child, is decisive to "redeem his father's soul". Wishing to repay his father's debt and to secure the forgiveness, Fikret wanders into the real world of Sarajevo, the world that is ruled by post-war chaos, misery and poverty and becomes an ideal target for two corrupted policemen who wish to "help" him: they plant the kidnapped girl on him.

Cast
Haris Sijarić as Fikret
Svetozar Cvetković as Ramiz
Kemal Čebo as Tiki
Zana Marjanović as Sara
Emir Hadžihafizbegović as Hamid
Aleksandar Seksan as Cico
Sadžida Šetić as Majka
Admir Glamočak as Klupa
Dragan Jovičić as Jasmin
Saša Petrović as Shopkeeper
Ðani Jaha as Špico
Miraj Grbić as Ćupo
Maja Salkić as Air Hostess #1
Amar Bektešević as Child actor
Dženana Nikšić as Selma
Senad Bašić as Ispijeni
Ermin Sijamija as Mister BH
Moamer Kasumović as Boy sitting on bench #2

Awards and nominations

Wins
Bermuda International Film Festival - Jury Prize - 2004
Golden Iris - Brussels European Film Festival - 2004
Tiger Award - Rotterdam International Film Festival - 2004
MovieZone Award - Rotterdam International Film Festival - 2004
Sofia International Film Festival - Special Jury Award - 2004
Sofia International Film Festival - FIPRESCI Prize - 2004

Nominations
Sofia International Film Festival - Grand Prix - 2004
Sarajevo Film Festival - The Heart of Sarajevo (Best Film Award)

Soundtrack

The soundtrack for the film, released as Zlatna Dolina, was compiled by Edo Maajka.

External links

Official Website

2003 films
Bosnia and Herzegovina drama films
Serbo-Croatian-language films
Films set in Bosnia and Herzegovina
2000s crime films